Kiryowa Kiwanuka Nsumikambi Mugambe commonly known as Kiryowa Kiwanuka is a Ugandan lawyer, businessman and politician who serves as the Attorney General of Uganda in the Ugandan Cabinet. He was appointed to that position on 8 June 2021, replacing William Byaruhanga, who was dropped from cabinet.

Background and education
Kiwanuka was born in Uganda circa 1972. His father, the late Jimmy Mugambe Kiwanuka was a Ugandan lawyer. His late paternal grandfather, Jolly Joe Kiwanuka, was a Ugandan politician who was murdered by dictator Idi Amin in the early 1970s.

Kiryowa spent his early childhood in Nairobi, Kenya, where the family lived in political exile, before returning to Uganda in 1980. He attended Budo Junior School for his elementary school. He then transferred to Kings College Budo for his O-Level studies. For his A-Level education, he studied at Makerere College School. In 1993, he was admitted to Makerere University, Uganda's oldest and largest public university, to study law.

Kiryowa Kiwanuka graduated from Makerere University, with a Bachelor of Laws degree. He then attended the Law Development Centre, graduating with a Diploma in Legal Practice. He was admitted to the Uganda Bar in 1997. Later, he was awarded the degree of Master of Laws in Petroleum Law and Policy by the University of Dundee in Scotland.

Career
Prior to his current appointment, Kiwanuka was a founding Partner of K and K Advocates & Solicitors Uganda, a privately owned Kampala law firm. On 8 June 2021, he was appointed as Attorney General of Uganda.

Family
Kiryowa is married to Sarah Kiwanuka, whom he met in 1997. They are the parents of four children. He has a younger brother, Bakadde Kiwanuka, who practices law in the United Kingdom.

Other responsibilities
Kiryowa Kiwanuka serves on the board of directors of the Petroleum Authority of Uganda, since 2015. He also serves as the Chairman of Express Football Club, a premier league soccer club in Uganda.

See also
 Cabinet of Uganda
 Parliament of Uganda

References

Living people
1972 births
21st-century Ugandan lawyers
Ganda people
People from Central Region, Uganda
Makerere University alumni
Law Development Centre alumni
Alumni of the University of Dundee
Attorneys General of Uganda
Members of the Parliament of Uganda
People from Wakiso District
21st-century Ugandan politicians